Ravikumar Niranjan   is the fifth Bishop of Northern Karnataka of the Church of South India: he has been in office since 2012.

Niranjan has also been an ecumenical liaison officer in Germany and Treasurer of Northern Karnataka Diocese.

Notes

 

21st-century Anglican bishops in India
Church of South India clergy
Indian bishops
Indian Christian religious leaders
Anglican bishops of Northern Karnataka
Year of birth missing (living people)
Living people